Kandaulos (also) was an ancient Greek luxury dish of Lydian origin. The  Ionian rich savoury confection was a new delicacy in Athens in the early 4th century BC.
According to the Greek rhetorician and grammarian Athenaeus (late 2nd century AD), kandaulos came in three forms. A second was savoury, consisting of meat and broth with breadcrumbs. However, what these two kinds of kandaulos had in common with one another or with the third kind is not clear.

The term kandaulos appears to be related to the Lydian word  Kandaules, recorded by Hipponax and Herodotus. This was a title of Hermes and Heracles and name or title of a Lydian king. But Tzetzes, a Byzantine poet and grammarian from the 12th century, says that kandaules was also Lydian for dog-throttler.

Athenaeus (Deipnosophists XII 516c-d) quotes a brief recipe for the meaty version of kandaulos from Hegesippus of Tarentum, an author of Greek works on cookery and on cake-making of the 4th century BC:

The Lydians used also to speak of a dish called kandaulos, of which there were three varieties, not one merely; so exquisitely equipped were they for luxurious indulgence. Hegesippus of Tarentum says that it was made of boiled meat, bread crumbs, Phrygian cheese, anise, and fatty broth.

In the original Greek:

.

See also 
 Ancient Greek cuisine

Notes and references

Ancient Greek cuisine
Ancient Greece
Lydia